CNE may refer to:

 Canadian National Exhibition, Canada's largest annual fair
 CNE Bandshell, an open-air concert venue of the above
 Care New England, a non-profit healthcare provider system in Rhode Island
 Central New England Railway, reporting mark CNE, a railroad line absorbed by New Haven Railroad in 1927
 Centre for the New Europe, a defunct think tank in Brussels
 Computer Network Exploitation, a type of military Computer network operations
 Corpo Nacional de Escutas – Escutismo Católico Português, the largest Catholic scouting organization in Portugal
 Contrat nouvelle embauche, a French employment contract
 National Electoral Council (Colombia), natively Consejo Nacional Electoral
 National Electoral Council (Venezuela), natively Consejo Nacional Electoral